Dick Grayson is a character appearing in DC comics.

Dick Grayson may also refer to:
 Dick Grayson (1989 film series character), character portrayed by Chris O'Donnell
 Robin (Earth-Two)
 "Dick Grayson" (Titans episode)
 Dick Grayson (Titans character)